XI Turkmenistan President Cup (2005)

All matches played at Köpetdag Stadium, Ashgabat.

Group A

Group B

Third Place

Final 

 

2005
President
2005 in Tajikistani football
2005 in Armenian football
2005 in Kazakhstani football
2005 in Uzbekistani football
2004–05 in Ukrainian football